Fantastic Fireworks is a British company that stages large-scale fireworks displays in Europe and the Far East. It was founded in 1985 and is based in Pepperstock.

Awards and recognitions
Fantastic Fireworks are twice winners of the British Fireworks Championship (1997 and 2015) and have been recognized for the quality of their fireworks displays. In 2006, they earned an entry in the Guinness World Records for a rocket launch in Plymouth, Devon that involved 56,645 rockets being set off in thirty seconds. In 1997, it was the first winner of the British Fireworks Championship. In 2015 the company won the title for a second time In 2016 Fantastic Fireworks won the Best Visual Spectacular category of the Event Production Awards for its production of Jeff Wayne's Musical Version of The War of the Worlds

Fireworks Training School

Fantastic Fireworks set up and runs Britain's first Fireworks Training School. Offered are courses covering both domestic (Category 3) and professional (Category 4) fireworks. The latter include the British Pyrotechnists Association (BPA) Firer and Senior Firer qualification.

Professional Memberships and Associations

Fantastic Fireworks is a member of the BPA (British Pyrotechnists Association) and the  CBI (Confederation of British Industry) Explosives Industry Group.

References

External links
 Official Fireworks Display Site
 Official Fireworks for sale Website
 Official Fireworks Training Website

Pyrotechnics
1985 establishments in the United Kingdom
Companies established in 1985
Fireworks companies
Manufacturing companies of the United Kingdom
Companies based in Bedfordshire
1985 establishments in England
Manufacturing companies established in 1985